Henry Casimir de Rham (15 July 1785 – October 1873) was a Swiss–American merchant and diplomat.

Biography 
Henry Casimir de Rham was born on 15 July 1785 in Giez, Switzerland His father was Johann Christoph Wilhelm de Rham of Braunschweig, Saxony, Germany and his mother was Anne of Scottish origin. Of a robust physical appearance he attended the Military school in Munich, Bavaria. In 1803 he had opened a business in New York. After the War of 1812 he entered business reletionship with Isaac Iselin Roulet. In 1815, de Rham married Maria Theresa Moore and two of her brothers became partners in the business. He and his wife had four children. 

In July 1822 de Rham was appointed to be one of the first two Swiss consuls to the United States by the Federal Diet of Switzerland. He assumed responsibility for a district encompassing the New England states, New York, New Jersey, Pennsylvania, Delaware, and the states north of the Ohio River. In 1842, de Rham retired from his office as the Swiss consul. In his later life he was an avid Whist player and joined a Whist club. 

He died in October 1873 in New York City. He was interred alongside his wife at St. Mark's Church in-the-Bowery.

Citations

References 

 
 

Consuls of Switzerland
Switzerland–United States relations
American businesspeople